Massy TGV is a TGV railway station in Massy, France. Massy TGV is a new station, located in Île-de-France, was built for the LGV Atlantique. Thus certain trains serve at Montparnasse Station and this station simultaneously, although it is not permitted to use the TGV to travel between those two stations.

Services 
The proximity of station the Massy – Palaiseau RER station (one can even consider that Massy TGV is an extension of this station) makes it possible for this station to serve a great part of south Paris and its suburbs. The station also offers the advantage of enabling Lille–Tours(–Bordeaux) and Strasbourg-Tours(-Bordeaux) trains to serve Paris via the LGV Interconnexion Est without having to turn around at a terminus station (e.g. Gare de l'Est or Gare de Lyon). However, in spite of these advantages, the traffic of this station remains low.

History 
On 29 September 1991, Massy TGV was inaugurated by the SNCF. It had a total cost of 160 million Francs ( the equivalent to €24.4 million).

The station project first received the opposition of the SNCF and the local residents of Massy; the project was considered to be too close to Montparnasse station, in Paris, and a potential nuisance. The Ministry of Transport nevertheless pursued the project, as the station might avoid the suburban commuters having to travel through the capital with the RER C or B from Massy-Palaiseau.

In 2007, works were launched in order to restructure the area and the station and better integration in Massy. This involves the construction of a footbridge which would link Massy TGV, Massy – Palaiseau SNCF station, Massy – Palaiseau RATP station. The end of the works, initially programmed for 2010, has been delayed by two years.

References

External links
 
 US travel information with map of the station's surroundings

Railway stations in Essonne
Railway stations in France opened in 1991